Collioure is a commune in the southern French department of Pyrénées-Orientales.

Geography 
The town of Collioure is on the Côte Vermeille (Vermilion Coast), in the canton of La Côte Vermeille and in the arrondissement of Céret.

Toponymy 
Collioure is named Cotlliure in Catalan.

History
There is a record of the castle at "Castrum Caucoliberi" having been mentioned as early as 673, indicating that the settlement here was of strategic and commercial importance during the Visigoth ascendancy.

Collioure used to be divided into two villages separated by the river Douy, the old town to the south named Port d'Avall (in French known as Le Faubourg) and the upstream port, Port d'Amunt (in French known as Le Mouré).

Collioure was taken in 1642 by the French troops of Maréchal de la Meilleraye. A decade later, the town was officially surrendered to France by the 1659 Treaty of Pyrenees. Because of its highly strategic importance, the town's fortifications, the Château Royal de Collioure and the Fort Saint-Elme stronghold, were improved by the military engineer Vauban during the reign of Louis XIV. Nevertheless, Collioure was besieged and occupied by the Spanish troops in 1793, marking the last Spanish attempt to take the city. The city was retaken a year later by general Jacques François Dugommier.

In 1823, the territory of Port-Vendres became a commune, taking parts from the communes of Collioure and Banyuls-sur-Mer.

Many orchards as well as cork oak woodlands were damaged.

Government and politics

Mayors

Twin city
 Soria, Castile and León, Spain.

Population

Economy 
Collioure is the name of an Appellation d'Origine Contrôlée (AOC) situated around the town, (Collioure AOC), producing red, rosé and a few white wines. The ancient terraced vines in the hills behind the town also provide grapes for the apéritif and dessert wines of the (Banyuls) appellation, which shares its boundaries with the Collioure appellation.

Collioure is also famous for its anchovies, and its once-thriving fisheries are referenced in Mark Kurlansky's book Salt.

Culture

As the town has a strong Catalan culture, its own motto has been adopted by one of the local Catalan rugby teams (USA Perpignan, France):  Sempre endavant, mai morirem (Always forward, We'll never die). Under 's leadership, the town has an alternative motto, Collioure sera toujours Collioure (Collioure shall always be Collioure) quoting French singer Maurice Chevalier's famous song titled Paris sera toujours Paris.

The annual Saint Vincent festival is held around August 15, attracting twice the town's population in visitors for several days of celebration with music and fireworks.

In the early 20th century Collioure became a center of artistic activity, with several Fauve artists making it their meeting place.  André Derain, Georges Braque, Othon Friesz, Henri Matisse, Pablo Picasso, Charles Rennie Mackintosh, James Dickson Innes and Tsuguharu Fujita have all been inspired by Collioure's royal castle, medieval streets, its lighthouse converted into the church of Notre-Dame-des-Anges and its typical Mediterranean bay. Collioure's cemetery contains the tomb of  Spanish poet Antonio Machado, who fled here to escape advancing Francoist troops at the end of the Spanish Civil War in 1939.

The British novelist Patrick O'Brian lived in the town from 1949 until his death in 2000, and his novel The Catalans describes Collioure life as it was in the past. He also wrote a biography of Picasso, who was an acquaintance. O'Brian and his wife Mary are also buried in the town cemetery.

The start of Rose Macaulay’s 1950 novel, The World My Wilderness, is set in Collioure.

Part of the action in Stephen Clarke's fourth comic novel featuring Paul West, Dial M for Merde, takes place in Collioure.

Ninety-eight reproductions of Matisse’s and Derain’s works are displayed exactly where these two masters of Fauvism painted the originals in the early 20th century.

Notable people 

 Nur Ali Sheikh (1928-), Kenyan-born neo-cubist painter who lived in the house depicted by Matisse in his View of Collioure 
 René Llense (1913-2014), football player born in Collioure.
 Antonio Machado (1875-1939), Spanish poet died in Collioure.
 Patrick O'Brian (1914-2000), English novelist and translator, lived and was buried in Collioure.

See also 
Communes of the Pyrénées-Orientales department

References

External links 

 Tourist office website
 Webpage about the fortifications of Collioure
 Photos of Collioure
  Information of the Royal Castle of Collioure
 Cotlliure History and information in Catalan Encyclopaedia.

Linguistic rights
Communes of Pyrénées-Orientales
Northern Catalonia
Seaside resorts in France